Omran Mohamed Al Jesmi  is a UAE football defender who played for United Arab Emirates in the 2004 Asian Cup. He also played for Al Shabab and Al Jazira

External links

1976 births
Living people
2004 AFC Asian Cup players
Al-Shaab CSC players
Al Jazira Club players
Place of birth missing (living people)
Emirati footballers
United Arab Emirates international footballers
UAE Pro League players
Association football defenders